Stephenson Antonio Wallace (born November 11, 1982) is a former swimmer from Saint Vincent and the Grenadines, who specialized in sprint freestyle events. Wallace competed only in the men's 50 m freestyle at the 2000 Summer Olympics in Sydney. He received a ticket from FINA, under a Universality program, in an entry time of 29.58. He challenged six other swimmers in heat one, including 16-year-olds Wael Ghassan of Qatar and Hassan Mubah of the Maldives. Diving in with a 0.87-second deficit, Wallace scorched the field to post a fourth-seeded time and a lifetime best of 27.84. Wallace failed to advance into the semifinals, as he placed seventy-first overall out of 80 swimmers in the prelims.

References

1982 births
Living people
Saint Vincent and the Grenadines male freestyle swimmers
Olympic swimmers of Saint Vincent and the Grenadines
Swimmers at the 2000 Summer Olympics
Pan American Games competitors for Saint Vincent and the Grenadines
Swimmers at the 2003 Pan American Games
People from Kingstown